Ramokgonami is a village located in the Central District of Botswana. It had 4,486 inhabitants at the 2011 census.

See also
 List of cities in Botswana

References

Populated places in Botswana